Jan Lubrański (1456 – 22 May 1520) was a Polish bishop, politician and diplomat. His coat of arms was Godziemba.

Information
Lubrański was bishop of Płock between 1497 and 1498 and bishop of Poznań since 1498, founder of many churches in his dioceses, initiator of the reconstruction of the Poznań cathedral. As a bishop he was automatically a senator, close collaborator of the Polish kings, he was frequently used as a diplomat.
In 1519 he founded a college in Poznań, which is named Lubrański Academy in his memory.

Bibliography
 Antoni Gąsiorowski, Jerzy Topolski: Wielkopolski słownik biograficzny, Warszawa-Poznań 1983, PWN 
 Jan Pakulski, Krąg rodzinny biskupa Jana Lubrańskiego, Kronika Miasta Poznania, 1999, 2, s. 28–43.

External links

References

Ecclesiastical senators of the Polish–Lithuanian Commonwealth
1456 births
1520 deaths
Diplomats from Poznań
15th-century Polish nobility
Bishops of Poznań
15th-century Roman Catholic bishops in Poland
16th-century Roman Catholic bishops in Poland
Burials at Poznań Cathedral
Clan of Godziemba
16th-century Polish nobility